XHCEA-FM is a community radio station in Los Reyes de Salgado, Michoacán, broadcasting on 89.1 FM. It is owned by Colectivo Expresión Alternativa, A.C. and is known as Radio Paraíso.

XHCEA broadcasts from 3 to 9pm on weekdays.

References

Radio stations in Michoacán
Community radio stations in Mexico
Radio stations established in 2015